Petar Ivanov Stefanov (Петър Иванов Стефанов, born ) is a Bulgarian male former weightlifter, who competed in the first heavyweight class and represented Bulgaria at international competitions. He won the gold medal at the 1989 World Weightlifting Championships in the 100 kg category. He participated at the 1992 Summer Olympics in the 100 kg event. He won the gold medal at the 1989 European Championships in the Sub-Heavyweight class (415.0 kg) and the bronze medal at the 1991 European Championships in the Sub-Heavyweight class (372.5 kg).

References

External links
 

1966 births
Living people
Bulgarian male weightlifters
World Weightlifting Championships medalists
Place of birth missing (living people)
Olympic weightlifters of Bulgaria
Weightlifters at the 1992 Summer Olympics
20th-century Bulgarian people
21st-century Bulgarian people